I12 or I-12 may refer to:
 I12 engine
 Interstate 12, a highway in the U.S. state of Louisiana
 
Jönköping Regiment (1816–1927), a Swedish infantry regiment
Småland Regiment (1928–1974), a Swedish infantry regiment

See also
 112 (disambiguation)